Herd That is an American basketball team that participates in The Basketball Tournament (TBT), an annual winner-take-all single-elimination tournament. The team played as the West Virginia Wildcats in the 2018 and 2019 editions of the TBT, but rebranded as an alumni team of the Marshall Thundering Herd men's basketball program in 2020. The roster of Herd That consists of professional basketball players who compete outside of the NBA.

History

References

External links 
 Team page

The Basketball Tournament teams
Basketball teams in West Virginia
Basketball teams established in 2018
Marshall Thundering Herd men's basketball